The North Bolivar Consolidated School District, formerly the North Bolivar School District is a public school district located in northern Bolivar County in the state of Mississippi. It is headquartered in Mound Bayou with an office in Shelby.

The school district serves the towns of Mound Bayou, Shelby, Alligator, Winstonville, and Duncan.

The superintendent  is Maurice Smith.

History
On July 1, 2014 the North Bolivar School District consolidated with the Mound Bayou Public School District to form the North Bolivar Consolidated School District. The central office for this consolidated district is located in Mound Bayou. The two former districts were abolished with the resulting district a new one.

As three of the five board members of the consolidated district were from the former Shelby-based North Bolivar school district, the representatives of that district had full control of the entire district. After the merger with North Bolivar perception of Mound Bayou district residents was that the state had interfered with a previously stable school district.

The district's board voted to close two schools effective 2018, on a 3 to 2 basis: John F. Kennedy High School and Shelby Middle School, as the district overall had fewer students than before and because of a diminished financial situation. In August 2018 the Mississippi Supreme Court finalized the closure of Kennedy.

Academic performance
For the 2018-2019 school year the State of Mississippi stated that the school district had an "F" accountability rating. The district argued that the state had factored in the graduation rates of the high schools even though the state stated that it would use the overall accountability rating of the district for those schools in the event of their consolidation.

Schools
Secondary school (grades 7-12):
Northside High School (Shelby)

Elementary schools:
Brooks Elementary School (Duncan)
I.T. Montgomery Elementary School (Mound Bayou)
It was named after Isaiah Montgomery, cofounder of Mound Bayou.

 Former schools
 Broad Street High School (Shelby)
 John F. Kennedy Memorial High School (Mound Bayou)
 Shelby Middle School  (Shelby)

Demographics

2008–09 school year
There were a total of 737 students enrolled in the pre-merger North Bolivar School District during the 2008–2009 school year. The gender makeup of the district was 49% female and 51% male. The racial makeup of the district was 99.19% African American, 0.54% Hispanic and 0.27% White. Currently 100% of students are eligible to receive free or reduced lunch.

Previous school years

Accountability statistics

2002–2007

2008–2009

See also

List of school districts in Mississippi

References

Further reading
Legislation from the Mississippi Legislature requiring the Bolivar County school district consolidations
Ruling from the  U.S. Department of Justice about the Bolivar County school district consolidations
Maps of old and new districts with new board districts

External links

 (Former district)

Education in Bolivar County, Mississippi
School districts in Mississippi
School districts established in 2014